Luca Asta Sardelis (born 18 January 2001) is an Australian actress known for roles in Barracuda, Sam Fox: Extreme Adventures, Nowhere Boys Deadlock, and The Hunting.

Background
Sardelis was born in Adelaide to parents Bill Sardelis and Helena Kouzapa Sardelis. Her parents are of Greek descent. They have resided in the Somerton Park, suburb of Adelaide. She attended Westminster School, Adelaide.

References

External links

Living people
Australian people of Greek Cypriot descent
Australian people of Greek descent
Actresses from Adelaide
Australian child actresses
2001 births